Vladimir Afonin (born 11 December 1947) is a Belarusian long-distance runner. He competed in the men's 5000 metres at the 1972 Summer Olympics, representing the Soviet Union.

References

External links

1947 births
Living people
Athletes (track and field) at the 1972 Summer Olympics
Belarusian male long-distance runners
Soviet male long-distance runners
Olympic athletes of the Soviet Union